Kutlu Torunlar (born 23 August 1968) is a Turkish windsurfer. He competed at the 1992 Summer Olympics and the 1996 Summer Olympics.

References

External links
 
 

1968 births
Living people
Turkish windsurfers
Turkish male sailors (sport)
Olympic sailors of Turkey
Sailors at the 1992 Summer Olympics – Lechner A-390
Sailors at the 1996 Summer Olympics – Mistral One Design
Sportspeople from Istanbul